Vesco is a surname and can refer to:

  (b.ca.1994), Italian actor
 Don Vesco (1939–2002), American businessperson and motorcycle racer
  (b.1929), Italian botanist with the standard author abbreviation Dal Vesco
  (b.1925), German actress
  (1816-1880), French surgeon
 Jean-Paul Vesco (b.1962), French Dominican bishop
 Lucas Vesco (b.1991), Argentine professional footballer 
  (1789-1883), French military officer
 Robert Vesco (1935–2007), American criminal financier
  (1923-2009), Argentine sports administrator

See also
 , also known as Vesco, Imperial German Navy ship
 Vesco Tennis Courts, a privately held firm started by the family of Dorothy Vest